Nicholas Ball may refer to:
 Nicholas Ball (actor) (born 1946), British actor
 Nicholas Ball (alderman) (died 1609), Irish merchant and public official
 Nicholas Ball (lawyer) (1791–1865), Irish lawyer and judge and the father of the naturalist John Ball
Nicholas Ball (MP) (died 1586), MP for Totnes